This is a list of hospitals in Bursa Province, Turkey.

State hospitals
Bursa Devlet Hastanesi
Gemlik Devlet Hastanesi
Harmancık Devlet Hastanesi
İnegöl Devlet Hastanesi
İznik Devlet Hastanesi
Karacabey Devlet Hastanesi
Mudanya Devlet Hastanesi
Mustafakemalpaşa Devlet Hastanesi
Orhaneli Devlet Hastanesi
Orhangazi Devlet Hastanesi
Yenişehir Devlet Hastanesi
Bursa Şehir Hastanesi

Social security hospitals
SSK Demirtaş Polikliniği
SSK Duaçınar Polikliniği
SSK Gemlik Hastanesi
SSK Hastanesi
SSK İnegöl Hastanesi
SSK Karacabey İstasyonu
SSK Kestel İstasyonu
SSK Orhangazi İstasyonu
SSK P. Sanayi Polikliniği
SSK Şevket Yılmaz Hastanesi

Birth hospitals
Zübeyde Hanım Doğumevi

University hospitals
Uludağ Üniversitesi Tıp Fakültesi Hastanesi

Special hospitals
A.O.S. Onkoloji Hastanesi
Bursa Çocuk Hastanesi
Göğüs Hastanesi
Yüksek İhtisas Hastanesi
Dr. Ayten BOZKAYA Spastik Çocuklar Hastanesi ve Rehabilitasyon Merkezi

Private hospitals
Özel Bursa Anadolu Hastanesi 
Özel Acıbadem Bursa Hastanesi
Özel Jimer Hastanesi
Özel Ceylan İnternational Hospital
Özel Medicabil Hastanesi
Özel Gümüş Göl Hastanesi
Özel Retinagöz Hastanesi
Özel Esentepe Hastanesi
Özel VM Medical Park Bursa Hastanesi
Özel Doruk Bursa Hastanesi
Özel Hayat Hastanesi
Özel Çekirge Kalp ve Aritmi Hastanesi
Özel Dünya Göz Bursa Hastanesi
Özel Doruk Yıldırım Hastanesi	
Özel Aritmi İnegöl Hastanesi
Özel Cihangir Hastanesi	
Özel Romatem FTR Hastanesi
Özel Pembe Mavi Hastanesi	
Özel Aritmi Osmangazi Hastanesi
Özel Medicana Bursa Hastanesi
Özel Medicabil Yıldırım Hastanesi

References
 https://bursaism.saglik.gov.tr/TR,15520/saglik-kurumlari.html?_Dil=1

Hospitals
Bursa